Francis Monkman (born 9 June 1949, in Hampstead, North London, England) is an English rock, classical and film score composer, and a founding member of both the progressive rock band Curved Air and the classical/rock fusion band Sky. He is the son of Kenneth Monkman, an authority on the writer Laurence Sterne, and of Vita née Duncombe Mann.

Career
Monkman was a pupil at Westminster School where he studied organ and harpsichord, later studying at the Royal Academy of Music, winning the Raymond Russell prize for virtuosity on the harpsichord and becoming a member of the Academy of St. Martin in the Fields.

Wanting to experiment with more spontaneous music forms, Monkman learned how to play guitar and began to associate himself with rock music. In the late 1960s he founded the rock band Sisyphus, which evolved into the pioneering band Curved Air. Monkman played on their first three albums, doubling on keyboards and guitar and exploring his interest in jamming, overtones, natural harmonies and freer aspects of musicality. With group violinist Darryl Way, Monkman also contributed the bulk of the band's composing, although he and Way rarely collaborated. Differences of opinion with Way ultimately led to Monkman's departure from the band following the release of Phantasmagoria (1972).  Curved Air singer Sonja Kristina has commented "(Francis likes) jamming... real 'out there' cosmic rock jamming. And that is not Darryl at all... He's a very disciplined perfectionist, he likes things to be as precise and exquisite as possible. Whereas Francis is completely the opposite way; he just wants to play and things just come out of the cosmos". Monkman returned briefly to Curved Air for a 1974 tour intended to pay off the group's outstanding tax bill, which resulted in the release of the 1975 concert album Live, but departed again at the end of the tour.

After leaving Curved Air, Monkman contributed to the Renaissance album Prologue (1972), worked with Al Stewart including contributing to the album Past, Present and Future (1973) as well as Lynsey de Paul on her Surprise album and toured with The Shadows on their 20 Golden Greats Tour (1977). Also in 1977, he collaborated with Phil Manzanera and Brian Eno on the project 801. In 1978, he played all keyboards on Brian Bennett's solo album Voyage.

In 1978, Monkman became a member of classical/rock music fusion band called Sky alongside guitarists John Williams and Kevin Peek, bass player Herbie Flowers and drummer/percussionist Tristan Fry. His keyboard work with Sky included extensive classical or classically-inspired harpsichord playing (highlighted on the band's electric version of Bach's "Toccata", which reached number 5 in the national pop single charts and obtained Sky a Top of the Pops appearance), piano, and a variety of synthesizer approaches including progressive rock complexity and psychedelic drones. During his time with the band, Monkman was arguably also their most prolific composer and arranger. For their debut album, he wrote the minor hit single "Cannonball" and the twenty-minute-long second-side composition "Where Opposites Meet" (which was intended to combine and display the band's diverse influences). On their second album, he performed a version of Jean-Philippe Rameau's "Gavotte & Variations" as an absolutely straight classical solo harpsichord rendition (further cementing the band's classical influences) and composed a second side-long twenty-minute long-form composition ("FIFO", for which the title and musical structure was inspired by computer data processing, and on which Monkman also played distorted psychedelic guitar alongside the more formal parts performed by Peek and Williams).  

During his time with Sky, Monkman had continued to release solo recordings which mingled original composition with film and television soundtracks and library music. His 1978 album Energism included the electronic  "Achievements of Man", from which extracts were used as the theme to the BBC programme Think Again. He also composed the piece "Current Affairs", used by Channel 4 as the introduction to Engineering Announcements, provided by the IBA. He would also become known as a synthesizer demonstrator on programs like the BBC's Tomorrow's World.

In 1980, Monkman's soundtrack to the British film, The Long Good Friday was so successful that he opted to amicably leave Sky in order to concentrate on television and soundtrack work. At around the same time, he resumed performances of classical harpsichord music.

In 1981 Monkman released an art/progressive rock album called Dweller on the Threshold. This was the first album on which he had sung lead vocals; it also featured Camel's Andy Latimer (guitar) and former Whitesnake drummer Dave Dowle, as well as singers Graham Laydon and
Julia Rathbone. 

After a twenty-year break, Monkman would start to release further albums again at the start of the twenty-first century, beginning with 2001's 21st Century Blues.

Instruments
Francis Monkman played guitar as well as keyboards in Curved Air, switching between them when playing live.
According to the sleeve notes for the second Sky album, Sky 2 he also played additional guitar parts on his composition "FIFO", alongside John Williams and Kevin Peek.

Keyboards
1977-1978: (tour with The Shadows)

Piano

Discography

 Contemporary Impact (With Malcolm Ironton) (1978) (KPM Music, Denmark Street 21, London)
 Energism (1978) (Bruton Music Limited, London) 
 Tempus Fugit (1978) (Bruton Music Limited, London) 
 Pictures In The Mind (With Malcolm Ironton) (1978) (KPM Music, Denmark Street 21, London)
 Classical Concussion (1979) (KPM Music, Denmark Street 21, London)
 Predictions (Part 1) (1979) (KPM Music, Denmark Street 21, London)
 Predictions (Part 2) (1979) (KPM Music, Denmark Street 21, London)
 Classycal Odyssey(1980) (KPM Music, Denmark Street 21, London)
 Dynamism (1980) (Bruton Music Limited, London) 
 The Long Good Friday Soundtrack (1981) (Nimbus Custom) Recorded at CTS Studios December 12, 18 and 20, 1979.
 Dweller on the Threshold (1981) (Maya Records)
 21st Century Blues (2001)
 Jam (2003)
 A Harpsichord Sampler (2003)

References

External links
 Francis Monkman's website
 
 2006 Interview
 Francis Monkman on the Curved Air website
 Biographical information on the Sky website

1949 births
People from Hampstead
English rock guitarists
English keyboardists
English composers
People educated at Westminster School, London
Curved Air members
Alumni of the Royal College of Music
Living people
Sky (English/Australian band) members
801 (band) members
Matching Mole members